Clubs affiliated with Capital Football in the Australian Capital Territory (ACT) – and surrounding areas of New South Wales – competed in 2014 for the Capital Football Federation Cup. Teams from the same Club playing in multiple divisions were allowed to compete. This knockout competition was won by Tuggeranong United, their 4th  title.

Winning the 2013 Federation Cup also entitled Tuggeranong United to become the ACT's sole qualifier for the 2014 FFA Cup, entering at the  Round of 32.  The original intention from Capital Football was that the Federation Cup would be the qualifying tournament to determine the ACT qualifier, but match scheduling issues meant the 2014 winner would not be decided until after the qualifier needed to be named. To overcome this Capital Football announced that the 2014 winner of the ACT's pre-season competition was to be the ACT's qualifier in 2014 , but Tuggeranong United successfully appealed to qualify them as the ACT's FFA Cup entrant for 2014.

Schedule

First round
22 teams from various divisions of the ACT State Leagues, as well as 4 Masters teams, entered into the competition at this stage. Matches in this round were played on 6 April.

 Byes:–UC Pumas (3), Weston Creek (3), ANU FC (SL2) (4), Narrabundah (8), Gungahlin Juventus (5), and Gungahlin United Masters 2 (-).

Second round
Matches in this round were played on 13 April.

Third round
8 Clubs from the ACT National Premier League (Tier 2) entered into the competition at this stage. Matches in this round were played between 2–23 May.

Quarter-finals
All matches in this round were completed by 3 July.

Semi-finals
Matches in this round were played between 25 July and 1 August.

Final
The winner also qualified for the 2014 FFA Cup Round of 32.

References

2013 in Australian soccer